was a Japanese samurai of the late Edo period. Son of the 3rd generation Tayasu family head, Narimasa, he was head of the Tayasu house twice: in 1839–1863 and 1868–1876. He went to Shizuoka Domain in 1868, and served as the guardian of his son the young daimyō Tokugawa Iesato. He was also the father of Tokugawa Takachiyo and Tokugawa Satotaka. His childhood name was Konnosuke (耕之助).

Family
 Father: Tokugawa Narimasa
 Mother: Shinozaki-dono (1794-1858)
 Wives: 
 Teruhime (1826–1840) daughter of 12th shōgun Tokugawa Ieyoshi
 Kan’in no Miya Yoshiko (1829-1906)
 Concubines:
 Takai-dono
 Sawai-dono
 Children:
 Kikuhime (1856-1865) by Takai
 Tokugawa Takachiyo by Takai
 son later Shiun’in (1862-1862) by Takai
 Tokugawa Iesato by Takai
 Tokugawa Satotaka by Takai
 Haruhime (1868-1868) by Takai
 Okimaru (1871-1871) by Takai
 Ryumaro (1862-1862) by Sawai
 Shizuhime (1866-1912) married Sakai Tadazumi by Sawai
 Kagahime (1867-1868) by Sawai
 Tokugawa Yorimichi (1872-1925) of Kii-Tokugawa Family by Sawai

Ancestry

References

|-

1828 births
1876 deaths
Samurai
Meiji Restoration
Tokugawa clan